William Thadius Judson, Sr. (born March 26, 1959, in Detroit, Michigan) is a former professional American football player who played cornerback for eight seasons for the Miami Dolphins.

His son, William Judson, Jr., played college football as a wide receiver for the Illinois Fighting Illini and Florida A&M.

References

1959 births
Living people
American football cornerbacks
Miami Dolphins players
South Carolina State Bulldogs football players
Players of American football from Detroit